Uhs Kug is a populated place situated in Pima County, Arizona, United States. The name is derived from the O'odham phrase, u:s ke:k, meaning "stick standing".

References

Populated places in Pima County, Arizona